Puddington may refer to:

 Puddington, Cheshire
 Puddington, Devon